Vangjel Tavo (17 December 1969) is an Albanian politician (member of Greek minority), member of the Assembly of the Republic of Albania for the Socialist Movement for Integration He served as the Minister of Health from 2012 to 2013, replacing Petrit Vasili.

Tavo was first in the Socialist Party of Albania but left for joining the Socialist Movement for Integration.

Tavo was born in a countryside near Gjirokastra, on 17 December 1969. He had a very good school career and finished with almost perfect marks for medicine and then on he has a specialisation for  Gynaecology. His political career started in 1996 when he, representing the Socialist Party of Albania, won the elections in Gjirokastra for the first time for his Party for after a very long time. But because a problem in the country he only entered the parliament in 1997. After that, until 2010, he was an MP of Albania being part of the Socialist Party. In this year he changed his Party and joined LSI which is another political party. Sometime later he became the Vice Speaker of the House. 
He replaced Petrit Vasili and became the Minister of Health for a short period of time.

References 

1969 births
Living people
Socialist Movement for Integration politicians
Members of the Parliament of Albania
People from Gjirokastër
Albanian physicians
21st-century Albanian politicians
Government ministers of Albania
Health ministers of Albania
Albanian people of Greek descent